ACS Fortuna Becicherecu Mic, commonly known as Fortuna Becicherecu Mic, is a Romanian  football club based in Becicherecu Mic, Timiș County. The team was founded in 2016 and is currently playing in the Liga III, third tier of the Romanian football system, after promoting at the end of the 2018–19 season.

Starting with the summer of 2020, Fortuna entered in a collaboration with ASU Politehnica Timișoara, basically becoming its unofficial satellite or second team.

History
Fortuna Becicherecu Mic was founded in the summer of 2016, when CS Nuova Mama Mia Becicherecu Mic moved from Becicherecu Mic to Timișoara, then Jimbolia. The new entity was formed and also took over the women's team of Nuova Mama Mia, including all of the players and staff, the equipment and the sports facilities under the name of ACS Fortuna Becicherecu Mic, thus insuring the continuity of the team under a new name. For this reason, the Romanian Football Federation allowed the women's team to keep its place in the second tier league, even though a third tier was created in 2016. On the other side, the men's team had to take it all over again, starting with the lowest league in Timiș County, Liga VI. However, in these difficult conditions, the "white and reds" managed three successive promotions.

The first season of liga III, they finished 3rd, their best performance to date. The following two seasons they finished 10th. The last season the series had only 10 teams so the 10th position meant relegation.

Honours

Leagues
Liga IV – Timiș County
Winners (1): 2018–19

Liga V – Timiș County
Winners (1): 2017–18

Liga VI – Timiș County
Winners (1): 2016–17

Cups
Cupa României – Timiș County
Winners (1): 2017–18

Club officials

Board of directors

Current technical staff

League history

References

External links
 
 

Association football clubs established in 2016
Football clubs in Timiș County
Liga III clubs
Liga IV clubs
2016 establishments in Romania